Horw railway station is a Swiss railway station in the municipality of Horw in the canton of Lucerne. It is on the Brünig line of the Zentralbahn railway company, which links Lucerne and Interlaken, and is also used by trains of the Luzern–Stans–Engelberg line.

Services 
 the following services stop at Horw:

The  provides additional weekday rush-hour service to Lucerne.

References

External links 
 
 

Railway stations in the canton of Lucerne
Zentralbahn stations